"Touch and Go Crazy" is a song written by Tom Shapiro, Michael Garvin and Bucky Jones, and recorded by American country music artist Lee Greenwood.  It was released in December 1987 as the third single from the album If There's Any Justice.  The song reached number 5 on the Billboard Hot Country Singles & Tracks chart.

Chart performance
"Touch and Go Crazy" debuted at number 59 on the U.S. Billboard Hot Country Singles & Tracks for the week of December 26, 1987.

Weekly charts

Year-end charts

References

1988 singles
1987 songs
Lee Greenwood songs
Songs written by Tom Shapiro
Song recordings produced by Jimmy Bowen
MCA Records singles
Songs written by Bucky Jones
Songs written by Michael Garvin